Loubet may refer to:

a former village, now part of Villeneuve-Loubet, Alpes-Maritimes, France
Alexandre Loubet (born 1994), French politician
Émile Loubet, politician, 8th president of France
Loubet Coast, a coast in Antarctica
a Brazilian singer